John 21 is the twenty-first and final chapter of the Gospel of John in the New Testament of the Christian Bible. It contains an account of a post-crucifixion appearance in Galilee, which the text describes as the third time Jesus had appeared to his disciples. In the course of this chapter, there is a miraculous catch of 153 fish, the confirmation of Peter's love for Jesus, a foretelling of Peter's death in old age, and a comment about the beloved disciple's future.

Text 
The original text was written in Koine Greek. This chapter is divided into 25 verses.

Textual witnesses
Some early manuscripts containing the text of this chapter are:
Papyrus 66 (c. AD 200; extant verses 1–9, 12, 17)
Papyrus 109 (3rd century; extant verses 18–20, 23–25)
Codex Vaticanus (325–350)
Codex Sinaiticus (330–360; complete)
Papyrus 122 (4th/5th century; extant verses 11–14, 22–24)
Codex Bezae (c. 400)
Codex Alexandrinus (400–440)
Codex Ephraemi Rescriptus (c. 450; complete)
Papyrus 59 (7th century; extant verses 7, 12–13, 15, 17–20, 23)

Later addition?

Scholarly discussions 
According to Helmut Koester (2000), similar to the Pericope Adulterae, though present in all extant manuscripts, is also widely recognized as a later addition. A redactor is thought to have later added some text to the original author's work.<ref name="Koester">{{Cite book |last=Koester |first=Helmut |date=2000 |title=Introduction to the New Testament, Volume 2 |url=https://books.google.com/books?id=thXUHM5udTcC&pg=PA192 |location=Berlin |publisher=Walter de Gruyter |page=192 |isbn=978-3-11014970-8 |access-date=6 January 2021}}</ref> Arguments in favour of this hypothesis include:
The fact that John 21 begins with the 'Johannine transition', After these things... which is used frequently in the Fourth Gospel, has led some scholars to suggest that John 21 was appended in the same way as Mark 16:9–20.
The part about the disciple whom Jesus loved 'underlines the authority of the special tradition of this gospel as the report of an eyewitness.' This urge to convince the reader of the credibility of the gospel, with the claim that it is based on an eyewitness account, seems to be at odds with the climax of the original gospel, where, after Doubting Thomas comes to believe in Jesus's resurrection, those who believe without having seen are blessed above those who need evidence in order to believe (John 20:24–29).
The Church Father Tertullian wrote, "And wherefore does this conclusion of the gospel affirm that these things were written unless it is that you might believe, it says, that Jesus Christ is the son of God?", which describes the end of Chapter 20, not Chapter 21. 

Scholars opposing a later addition by another author have argued the following:
No existing manuscript of the Gospel of John omits chapter 21.Chris Keith, The Pericope Adulterae, the Gospel of John, and the Literacy of Jesus (Brill 2009 ), p. 258
Westcott proposed a theory that the author simply decided to add an additional incident at some time after writing the book, but before final publication. In this view, the redactor and the original author are the same person.
Donald Guthrie commented: 'It is unlikely that another author wrote this section since there are several points of contact in it with the style and language of previous chapters.'

Manuscript evidence
The Nestle-Åland Novum Testamentum Graece (27th ed.) as well as major translations of the New Testament (e.g. KJV, NASB, NIV, RSV, NRSV) retain this chapter in their editions as original.

In other words, ancient manuscripts that contain the end of John 20 also contain text from John 21. So if John 21 is an addition, it was so early (which is not in doubt: part of John 21 appears in P66) and so widespread, that no evidence of the prior form has survived. This should however be balanced against the tendency for the first and last pages of codices to be lost: there are just four papyrus witnesses to John 20–21, only three of which date from the 4th century or earlier.Novum Testamentum Graece (NA28) and the United Bible Societies (UBS5) provide the critical text for John 21.

In 2006, following the discovery of a 4th-century Sahidic papyrus manuscript (Bodleian MS. Copt.e.150(P)) some scholars speculated that such text may end at 20:31, but this is not conclusive due to its fragmentary state.

 Contents 

Breakfast by the Sea of Tiberias (verses 1–14)

Verses 1–2After these things, Jesus revealed himself again to the disciples at the sea of Tiberias. He revealed himself this way.Simon Peter, Thomas called the Twin, Nathanael of Cana in Galilee, the sons of Zebedee, and two others of His disciples were together.Of these seven disciples, the last two remain unnamed. Ernst Hengstenberg suggests they may have been Andrew and Philip, whereas Heinrich Meyer suggests they were non-apostolic disciples from the wider group of those who followed Jesus.

Verse 4But when the morning had now come, Jesus stood on the shore; yet the disciples did not know that it was Jesus.The setting was in the "early morning", or at dawn. Alfred Plummer notes that a better translation is "Jesus came and stood on the beach.

Verse 11So Simon Peter went aboard and hauled the net ashore, full of large fish, 153 of them. And although there were so many, the net was not torn.Two points about the catch of fish are emphasized here:
 there were 153 large fish in the net. 
 even with so many, the net was not torn. 
Both are the kind of thing that would remain in the mind of a person who had witnessed them firsthand.

The number 153 is the 17th triangular number, as well as the sum of the first five positive factorials, and is associated with the geometric shape known as the Vesica Piscis (literally, "bladder of a fish") or Mandorla, which Archimedes, in his Measurement of a Circle, referred to in the ratio 153/265 as constituting the "measure of the fish", being an imperfect representation of 1/. Augustine of Hippo argued the significance of 153 being the sum of the first 17 integers is that 17 represents the combination of divine grace (the seven gifts of the Holy Spirit) and law (the Ten Commandments).John E. Rotelle (ed) and Edmund Hill (tr), The works of Saint Augustine: A Translation for the 21st Century, Part 3, Volume 7 (Sermons: On the Liturgical Seasons), p. 112, .

Jesus restores Peter (verses 15–19)

Jesus restores Peter to fellowship after Peter had previously denied him, and tells Peter to feed Jesus' sheep. This restoration of Peter occurs in verses 21:15–19.

The Disciple whom Jesus loved (verses 20–23)

The description of the "beloved disciple's" (normally assumed to be John the Apostle) fate is presented as an aside to Peter. Jesus says that it is not Peter's concern, even if Jesus should wish that that disciple remain alive until the end of time. The following verse clarifies that Jesus did not say "This disciple will not die", but that it was not for Peter to know.

The last appearance of the 'Disciple whom Jesus loved' in this Gospel, together with his first appearance in chapter 1 form a literary "inclusio of eyewitness testimony" to privilege this witness (in the Gospel of John 21:24) over Peter's, not to denigrate Peter's authority, but rather to claim a distinct qualification as an 'ideal witness' to Christ, because he survives Peter and bears his witness after Peter. Bauckham notes the occurrence of at least two specific words in the narratives of both the first and the last appearance of this disciple: "to follow" (Greek:  '') and "to remain/stay" (Greek:  ''). In the first chapter verse  it is stated that "Jesus turned, and seeing them following ('akolouthountas'), said to them, "What do you seek?"", then in verse  they "remained ('emeinan') with Him that day". In John 21, the last appearance of the 'Disciple whom Jesus loved' is indicated using similar words: in verse  it is written that "Peter, turning around, saw the disciple whom Jesus loved following ('akolouthounta')", then in verse  "Jesus said to him [Peter], "If I will that he remain ('menein') till I come, what is that to you?" The appearances are also close to Peter's, as the first one, along with Andrew, happened just before Peter's, who was then given the name 'Cephas' (alluding to Peter's role after Jesus' departure), and the last one, just after Jesus' dialogue with Peter, acknowledging the significance of Peter's testimony within "the Petrine's inclusio", which is also found in the Gospel of Mark and Luke (see Luke 8 under "The Women who sustained Jesus").

 Conclusion (verses 24–25) 
The chapter (and the whole book) is closed by two verses referring to the author of the gospel in the third person ("We know that his testimony is true").

 Verse 24 This is the disciple who is bearing witness about these things, and who has written these things, and we know that his testimony is true. Verse 25 And there are also many other things that Jesus did, which if they were written one by one, I suppose that even the world itself could not contain the books that would be written. Amen.''

Although ever since the 2nd century some people have taken verse 24 to mean that the author of the Gospel of John himself was the eyewitness (namely the disciple whom Jesus loved), other scholars point out that this verse indicates that the author is someone other than this disciple, because he is speaking about himself in the first person plural ('we know') and the disciple in the third person ('the disciple... who has written all these things'). Therefore, the author merely claims to have used an earlier written report, allegedly from this disciple, as a source for writing the Fourth Gospel.

See also
153 (number)
Overview of resurrection appearances in the Gospels and Paul
Pericope Adulterae
Related Bible parts: Mark 16, Luke 24, John 1

References

Sources

External links
 King James Bible - Wikisource
English Translation with Parallel Latin Vulgate
Online Bible at GospelHall.org (ESV, KJV, Darby, American Standard Version, Bible in Basic English)
Multiple bible versions at Bible Gateway (NKJV, NIV, NRSV etc.)

Biblical criticism
Gospel of John chapters
Galilee